The Colagne is a  long river in the Lozère département, southeastern France. Its source is in Arzenc-de-Randon. It flows generally southwest. It is a right tributary of the Lot into which it flows between Saint-Bonnet-de-Chirac and Le Monastier-Pin-Moriès.

Communes along its course
This list is ordered from source to mouth: 
 Arzenc-de-Randon, Pelouse, Le Born, Rieutort-de-Randon, Saint-Amans, Ribennes, Recoules-de-Fumas, Lachamp, Saint-Léger-de-Peyre, Marvejols, Chirac, Saint-Bonnet-de-Chirac, Le Monastier-Pin-Moriès

References

Rivers of France
Rivers of Lozère
Rivers of Occitania (administrative region)